Aghabala Aghasaid oghlu (1860–1928) was an Azerbaijani singer of folk music and mugam.

Life
Agabala Aghasaid oglu was born in 1860. From an early age, he was fond of poetry, music, learned the Persian language and got acquainted with poetry of Middle East. He participated in "Majmuish-shura" of mugham gatherings held in Baku in the 1880s, which had a strong impact on his career. He was mainly involved in mugham gatherings.

Career
Aghabala Agasaid oghlu was a khananda, who had a particular interest in poetry and literature. His performances of "Bayati-Shiraz", "Rast", "Shur" and "Segah-zabul" are distinguished for their sensitiveness. He performed together with famous tar players, including Shirin Akhundov, Mirza Mansur Mansurov, Ahmad Bakikhanov, Mirza Faraj Rzayev.

References

1860 births
1928 deaths
19th-century Azerbaijani male singers
Mugham singers
People from Absheron District